Raja ( King) is a 1995 Indian Hindi-language action romantic drama film directed and co-produced by Indra Kumar and starring Madhuri Dixit and Sanjay Kapoor. Paresh Rawal, Mukesh Khanna, Dalip Tahil, Rita Bhaduri and Himani Shivpuri appear in supporting roles. The film was released on 2 June 1995 and was a commercial success.

The success of the film was attributed to Dixit for her performance, earning her the Screen Award for Best Actress. At the 41st Filmfare Awards, the film received 11 nominations, including Best Film, Best Director (Kumar), Best Actress (Dixit), Best Supporting Actor (Rawal) and Best Supporting Actress (Bhaduri).

Plot 
Garewal brothers Rana Mahendra and Vishwa are good friends with the rich Birju Patangwala, and fix their 9-year-old sister Madhu's marriage with Birju's 10-year-old brother Raja; both become friends. As Birju loses all wealth in a fire at his factory, Rana and Vishwa break the marriage. Shocked, Birju becomes mad and is electrocuted by accident. He stays in the city outskirts with Raja caring for him by doing petty jobs.

13 years later

Grown-up, Madhu meets and falls in love with Raja, who reveals they saw them in their childhood, and their love deepens. Vishwa and Rana are determined to keep them away. Rana pretends to accept him and invites Birju to stay with him, getting one of their assistants dressed up like Birju. The assistant enters Madhu's room at night, trying to rape her. She duly screams Birju is trying to rape her. The assistant quickly escapes; the room is dimly lit before Madhu can see his face.

Raja returns, and is asked to believe Madhu or Birju. He believes Birju and breaks up with Madhu. Later, Raja gets hold of the assistant and extracts a confession. But he gets critically injured in an accident. Rana's wife Sumitra tells the truth to Madhu. Shocked that her own brothers set up her rape, Madhu leaves to go to Raja. Rana realises his mistakes and begs forgiveness. But Vishwa attacks them. Raja comes and saves them, marrying Madhu in front of everybody. Vishwa too feels sorry for his deeds. Raja and Madhu forgive all only if they bless their marriage.

Cast 
 Madhuri Dixit as Madhu Garewal Patangwala
 Sanjay Kapoor as Raja Patangwala
 Paresh Rawal as Brijnath "Birju" Patangwala
 Rita Bhaduri as Sumitra Garewal
 Mukesh Khanna as Rana Mahendra Pratap Garewal
 Dalip Tahil as Vishwa Garewal
 Tiku Talsania as Neta
 Himani Shivpuri as Kaki
 Dinesh Hingoo as Rongala
 Veeru Krishnan as neighbour
 Mushtaq Khan as Banwarilal
 Adi Irani as Abhishek Sanyal
 Sudhir as Police Inspector

Awards and nominations 
41st Filmfare Awards:

1996 Screen Awards:

Soundtrack 

The songs were composed by Nadeem-Shravan, while the lyrics were penned by Sameer. The album went on to become the second most sold Bollywood album of 1995. Nadeem-Shravan, for this album also received the Special Award London (UK).
The song "Nazrein Mili Dil Dhadka" was inspired from Sealed with a kiss Brian Hyland version copied from the soundtrack of the 1961 Rock Hudson movie, Come September. And the same tune was in 1967 film Humraaz. Starting tune of "Akhiyan Milaoon" was copied from Bangladeshi song "Ami Tomay Bhalobashi" from Andha Prem (1993), composed by Ahmed Imtiaz Bulbul.

References

External links 
 

1995 films
1990s Hindi-language films
Films directed by Indra Kumar
Films scored by Nadeem–Shravan